Monaco competed at the 2015 European Games, in Baku, Azerbaijan from 12 to 28 June 2015.

Athletics

Men

Overall

Cycling

Road
Men

Diving

Men

Judo 

Men

References

Nations at the 2015 European Games
European Games
2015